Stroud District Council in Gloucestershire, England is elected every four years. The all-out elections every four years began in 2016; up to and including the 2015 election one third of the council was elected each year, followed by one year without election.

Political control
Since the first elections to the council in 1973 political control of the council has been held by the following parties:

Leadership
The leaders of the council since 2001 have been:

Council elections
1973 Stroud District Council election
1976 Stroud District Council election
1979 Stroud District Council election
1983 Stroud District Council election (New ward boundaries)
1984 Stroud District Council election
1986 Stroud District Council election
1987 Stroud District Council election
1988 Stroud District Council election
1990 Stroud District Council election
1991 Stroud District Council election (New ward boundaries & district boundary changes also took place)
1992 Stroud District Council election
1994 Stroud District Council election
1995 Stroud District Council election
1996 Stroud District Council election
1998 Stroud District Council election
1999 Stroud District Council election
2000 Stroud District Council election
2002 Stroud District Council election (New ward boundaries reduced the number of seats by 4)
2003 Stroud District Council election
2004 Stroud District Council election
2006 Stroud District Council election
2007 Stroud District Council election
2008 Stroud District Council election (Some new ward boundaries)
2010 Stroud District Council election
2011 Stroud District Council election
2012 Stroud District Council election
2014 Stroud District Council election
2015 Stroud District Council election
2016 Stroud District Council election (New ward boundaries)
2021 Stroud District Council election

District result maps

By-election results

1993-1997

1997-2001

2001-2005

2005-2009

2009-2013

References

 By-election results

External links
Stroud District Council

 
Council elections in Gloucestershire
Stroud District
Stroud